The Philippines' Department of Social Welfare and Development (abbreviated as DSWD) is the executive department of the Philippine Government responsible for the protection of the social welfare of rights of Filipinos and to promote the social development.

History

In 1915, the Public Welfare Board (PWB) was created and was tasked to study, coordinate and regulate all government and private entities engaged in social services. In 1921, the PWB was abolished and replaced by the Bureau of Public Welfare under the Department of Public Instruction.

On November 1, 1939, Commonwealth Act No. 439 created the Department of Health and Public Welfare and in 1941, the Bureau of Public Welfare officially became a part of the Department of Health and Public Welfare. In addition to coordinating services of all public and private social welfare institutions, the Bureau also managed all public child-caring institutions and the provision of child welfare services.

In 1947, President Manuel Roxas abolished the Bureau of Public Welfare and created the Social Welfare Commission, under the Office of the President, in its place.

In 1968, Republic Act 5416, known as the Social Welfare Act of 1968, created the Department of Social Welfare, placing it under the executive branch of government. In 1976, the Department of Social Welfare was renamed Department of Social Services and Development (DSSD) through Presidential Decree No. 994. This was signed into law by President Ferdinand E. Marcos and gave the department an accurate institutional identity. On June 2, 1978, the DSSD was renamed Ministry of Social Services and Development (MSSD) in line with the change in the form of government.

In 1987, the MSSD was reorganized and renamed the Department of Social Welfare and Development (DSWD) through Executive Order 123, which was signed by President Corazon C. Aquino. Executive Order No. 292, also known as the Revised Administration Code of 1987, established the name, organizational structure, and functional areas of responsibility of DSWD and further defined its statutory authority.

In 1991, the passage of Republic Act No. 7160 otherwise known as the Local Government Code of 1991 affected the devolution of DSWD basic services to local government units.

Organizational structure
The department is headed by the Secretary of Social Welfare and Development (Philippines), with the following nine undersecretaries and eight assistant secretaries:
Undersecretary for General Administration and Support Services Group
Undersecretary for Special Concerns Group
Undersecretary for Policy and Plans Group
Undersecretary for Promotive Operations and Programs Group
Undersecretary for Protective Operations and Program Group 
Undersecretary for Disaster Response Management Group
Undersecretary for Support Programs Infrastructure Management
Undersecretary for Luzon Affairs
Undersecretary for Visayas Affairs
Undersecretary for Mindanao Affairs
Undersecretary for Legislative Liaison Affairs and Special Presidential Directives in the Mindanao Region
Assistant Secretary for General Administration and Support Services Group
Assistant Secretary for the Office of the Secretary
Assistant Secretary for Special Women's and Children's Concerns
Assistant Secretary for Special Concerns Group
Assistant Secretary for Promotive Programs
Assistant Secretary for Finance and Legal
Assistant Secretary for Policy and Plans Group in charge of National Household Targeting Office and Policy Development and Planning Bureau
Assistant Secretary for Policy and Plans in charge of Standards Bureau and Unconditional Cash Transfer (UCT) Project Management Office

Attached Agencies
 Council for the Welfare of Children
 National Authority for Child Care (NACC)
 Juvenile Justice and Welfare Council
 National Council on Disability Affairs

Supervised Agencies
 National Anti-Poverty Commission
 National Commission on Indigenous Peoples
 Presidential Commission for the Urban Poor

Programs and Services

The Pantawid Pamilyang Pilipino Program
The Pantawid Pamilyang Pilipino Program or "4Ps" (conditional cash transfer) is a human development program that invests in the health and education of poor families, primarily those with children aged 0–18.

Kalahi CIDSS – NCDDP
The Kapit-Bisig Laban sa Kahirapan – Comprehensive and Integrated Delivery of Social Services – National Community-Driven Development Program (Kalahi CIDSS–NCDDP) is the community-driven development program of the Philippine Government implemented through the Department of Social Welfare and Development. Supplemented by the government of the Philippines.

Sustainable Livelihood Program
The Sustainable Livelihood Program (SLP) is a community-based capacity building effort that seeks to improve the program participants’ socio-economic status through two tracks: Micro-enterprise Development and Employment Facilitation.

Listahanan
An information management system that identifies who and where the poor are in the country. It is being operated by the National Household Targeting System for Poverty Reduction (NHTS-PR).

Supplemental Feeding Program
Provision of food in addition to the regular meals, to target children as part of the DSWD's ECCD program of the government.

Disaster Response Operations
Life-saving emergency relief and long-term response.

RRPTP
Recovery and Reintegration Program for Trafficked Persons (RRTP) is a comprehensive package of programs and services, enhancing the psychosocial and economic needs of the beneficiaries.

PAMANA
Payapa at Masaganang Pamayanan (PAMANA) aims to improve access of poor communities to basic social services and promote responsive governance.

Protective Services Program
Assistance to Individuals In Crisis Situations (AICS) and Assistance to COmmunities in Needs (ACN)
Provides a range of interventions to individuals, families, and communities in crisis or difficult situations and vulnerable or disaster-affected communities.

ISWSFN
International Social Welfare Services for Filipino Nationals is a program for migrant Filipinos and other overseas Filipino nationals who are in crisis situation and in need of special protection are encouraged to seek assistance in the Philippine Embassies in their countries of destination.

Center & Residential Care Facilities
Services rendered in facilities 24-hour that provide alternative family care arrangement to poor, vulnerable and disadvantaged individuals or families in crisis.

Adoption and Foster Care
The act of adoption, of permanently placing a minor with a parent or parents other than the birth parents in the Philippines.

Gender and Development
Gender is about relations—between men and women, women and women, also between men and men and boys and girls. The GAD as perspective recognizes that gender concerns cut across all areas of development and therefore gender must influence government when it plans, budget for, implements, monitors and evaluates policies, programs and projects for development.

BUB
Pilot tested in 2013 and now on its 3rd cycle, the Bottom-Up Budgeting (BUB) Process is proposed to ensure implementation of priority poverty reduction projects.

Secretaries

References

3. DSWD

External links

Department of Social Welfare and Development
Social Welfare and Development
Philippines
Welfare in the Philippines
Philippines, Social Welfare and Development
1939 establishments in the Philippines